A crater is any of several kinds of landform appearing as a bowl-shaped depresion. Crater may also refer to:

Music
Crater (Daniel Menche and Mamiffer album), 2016
Crater (Fission album), 2004

Places
Crati or Crater, a river of southern Italy
Crater, California, U.S.
Crater (Aden), a district of the Aden Governorate, Yemen

Other uses
Crater (constellation)
The Crater (novel) an 1847 novel by James Fenimore Cooper
Joseph Force Crater (fl. 1889–1930), New York judge who disappeared in 1930

See also
Crater lake (disambiguation)
Cratering (disambiguation)
Krater, a Greek vessel used to mix wine and water (the original meaning)
Makhtesh, a crater-like formation created by erosion